Nicolai Næss (born 18 January 1993) is a Norwegian professional footballer who plays as a defender for Stabæk.

Career

Club
Næss made his debut for Vålerenga on 31 March 2012 against Strømsgodset, they lost the game 3–2.

Stabæk
Prior to the start of the 2013 season, Næss signed for Stabæk.

Columbus Crew SC
On 21 July 2016, Næss signed with Columbus Crew. He made his club debut on 13 August 2016 in a 3–3 draw against New York City FC.

Heerenveen
On 30 August 2017, Næss transferred to Eredivisie side Heerenveen for an undisclosed fee.

Career statistics

References

External links
 
 
 

1993 births
Living people
Footballers from Oslo
Norwegian footballers
Norway youth international footballers
Norwegian expatriate footballers
Vålerenga Fotball players
Stabæk Fotball players
Columbus Crew players
SC Heerenveen players
Sarpsborg 08 FF players
Eliteserien players
Norwegian First Division players
Major League Soccer players
Eredivisie players
Expatriate soccer players in the United States
Expatriate footballers in the Netherlands
Association football defenders